McCrary is a surname. It is derived from the Scottish Gaelic surname Mac Ruidhrí.

People with the surname
Alison McCrary (born 1982), American social justice movement lawyer, former Catholic nun, and Spiritual Advisor on Louisiana's death row
Darius McCrary (born 1976), American actor
Donny McCrary (born 1982), American professional boxer
Frank McCrary (1849–1921), American photographer
Fred McCrary (born 1972, American football player
George W. McCrary (1835–1890), a United States Secretary of War
Giles McCrary (born 1919), American entrepreneur
Greg McCrary (1952–2013), American football player
Gregg McCrary, former FBI agent turned author and professor
Howard McCrary, African-American musician, entertainer and actor
Jesse J. McCrary Jr. (1937–2007), Florida Secretary of State
Jim McCrary, American photographer
Michael McCrary (born 1970), American football player
Milo McCrary, a fictional character from American sitcom Drake & Josh
Nate McCrary (born 1999), American football player
Victor McCrary (born 1955), American physical chemist

Citations

References

Anglicised Scottish Gaelic-language surnames
Patronymic surnames